I Got Your Country Right Here is the fourth studio album by American country music artist Gretchen Wilson, released on March 30, 2010 via Redneck Records, her own label. The album's first single, "Work Hard, Play Harder", was released in October 2009, and became Wilson's first Top 20 hit since 2005's "All Jacked Up." The album's title track was released as the second single in August 2010, and "I'd Love to Be Your Last" was released in January 2011 as the third single.

Background
In an interview with The Boot in November 2009, Wilson was asked to describe her fourth studio album, saying, "I feel like I've invested a lot of time and thought and energy and emotions into this record. I feel like I sang better on this record than I ever have. Musically, it sounds just like it should, just like I want it to, just like my live show." She also thought that the album had more of a "connection with the audience" then her previous efforts.

Wilson, via her website, called I Got Your Country Right Here as the 'album of her career', stating: "This is the album of my career; This album turns the page for me. I'm proud of every song on here, and I'm excited about the team we've put together to get this music out to the fans."

I Got Your Country Right Here is also the first release for Wilson's personal label, Redneck Records, which she founded after leaving Sony Music Nashville's Columbia Nashville division in 2009.

"I'd Love to Be Your Last" was previously recorded by Clay Walker on his 2007 album Fall and later recorded by Marie Osmond and Marty Roe of Diamond Rio for Osmond's 2016 album Music Is Medicine.

Critical reception
Thom Jurek of Allmusic rated the album four stars out of five, saying that it showed her Southern rock influences and that it "rocks nearly as hard as her live shows and [proves] that she is not an industry-constructed image — she’s exactly who she’s portrayed herself to be all along."

Track listing

Personnel
Mike Brignardello - bass guitar
Pat Buchanan - electric guitar, slide guitar
J.T. Corenflos - electric guitar
Shannon Forrest - drums, percussion
Wes Hightower - background vocals
Paul Nelson - cello
Cherie Oakley - background vocals
Mark Oakley - electric guitar
Danny Rader - acoustic guitar, mandolin
Rivers Rutherford - acoustic guitar
Adam Shoenfeld - electric guitar
Chris Stapleton - background vocals
Gretchen Wilson - lead vocals, background vocals
Jonathan Yudkin - cello, fiddle

Chart performance

Album
I Got Your Country Right Here debuted at number 6 on the U.S. Billboard Top Country Albums chart and at number 34 on the U.S. Billboard 200, selling 14,753 copies in its first week. It reached 43,309 copies by June 6, 2010, and has sold 71,000 copies as of February 2013.

Singles

References

2010 albums
Gretchen Wilson albums
Albums produced by Blake Chancey
Albums produced by John Rich